The Bonomi III government of Italy held office from 12 December 1944 until 21 June 1945, a total of 190 days, or 6 months and 10 days.

Government parties
The government was composed by the following parties:

Composition

References

 
Italian governments
1944 establishments in Italy
1945 disestablishments in Italy